Bernt Kennet Andersson (born 6 October 1967) is a Swedish former professional footballer who played as a forward. Starting off his career with IFK Eskilstuna in the mid-1980s, he went on to play professionally in Sweden, Belgium, France, Italy, and Turkey before retiring in 2002. A full international between 1990 and 2000, he won 83 caps and scored 31 goals for Sweden national team and was a key member of the Sweden team that finished third at the 1994 FIFA World Cup. He also represented Sweden at UEFA Euro 1992 and 2000.

Club career
Andersson was born in Eskilstuna. On club level, he played for Tunafors SK (1976−1981), Eskilstuna (1982–88), Göteborg (1988–91), Mechelen (1991–92), Norrköping (1993), Lille (1993–94), Caen (1994–95), Bari (1995–96), Bologna (1996–99 and 1999–2000), Lazio (1999), Fenerbahçe (2000–02) and Gårda BK (2005).

International career
For Sweden, Andersson made 83 appearances and scored 31 goals, both near the top in national history. He played in the 1992 and 2000 European Championships. He led the Swedish team in scoring with five goals in the 1994 World Cup, a feat which tied him for third place as the tournament's leading goalscorer. His physical size gave him an advantage in the air, and in this tournament he became known for towering over defenders to score goals with his head; in Sweden's quarter-final win over Romania, he headed in a vital goal by outjumping even the Romanian goalkeeper.

Style of play
Andersson was considered one of the top-class strikers of his generation. A tall, athletic, and physically strong forward, who was also a prolific goalscorer, in spite of his lack of pace or notable technical skills, he was renowned for his work-rate, hold-up play with his back to goal, and in particular his excellent abilities in the air, which enabled him both to score goals with his head and get on the end of long balls to provide assists for his teammates from knock-downs; due to his playing style, he was frequently dubbed an "old-fashioned" centre-forward or "target-man" in the media throughout his career. BBC has described Andersson as "one of the world's greatest forwards in the air", adding that "his aerial ability is complemented by decent passing and unselfish support play that has allowed other strikers to flourish alongside him." Regarding his aerial prowess, Carlo Ancelotti described him as being "practically impossible" to mark in the air.

Career statistics

Scores and results list Sweden's goal tally first, score column indicates score after each Andersson goal.

Honours
IFK Göteborg
Allsvenskan: 1990, 1991
Svenska Cupen: 1990–91

Bologna
UEFA Intertoto Cup: 1998

Lazio
Serie A: 1999–2000
UEFA Super Cup: 1999

Fenerbahçe
1. Lig: 2000–01
Sweden
FIFA World Cup third place: 1994
Individual
Allsvenskan top scorer: 1991
FIFA World Cup Bronze Boot: 1994

References

1967 births
Living people
People from Eskilstuna
Association football forwards
Swedish footballers
Sweden international footballers
Sweden under-21 international footballers
Sweden youth international footballers
Swedish expatriate footballers
Expatriate footballers in Belgium
Expatriate footballers in France
Expatriate footballers in Italy
Swedish expatriate sportspeople in Belgium
Swedish expatriate sportspeople in France
Swedish expatriate sportspeople in Italy
Swedish expatriate sportspeople in Turkey
Expatriate footballers in Turkey
IFK Göteborg players
K.V. Mechelen players
IFK Norrköping players
Lille OSC players
Stade Malherbe Caen players
S.S.C. Bari players
Bologna F.C. 1909 players
S.S. Lazio players
Fenerbahçe S.K. footballers
Allsvenskan players
Ligue 1 players
Belgian Pro League players
Serie A players
UEFA Euro 1992 players
UEFA Euro 2000 players
1994 FIFA World Cup players
Süper Lig players
Sportspeople from Södermanland County